Düzgün (literally "smooth", "pleasant", "delightful") is a rather rare Turkish surname and to a still lesser extent also a male given name that is most popular among the Alevi Zaza Kurds in the eastern Tunceli Province also known as Dersim, where it is given in reverence to the local mythological character Düzgün Baba.

Surname 
 Gülşah Düzgün (born 1995), Turkish female Paralympian goalball player
 Orhan Düzgün (born 1967), Turkish bureaucrat
 Tekin Okan Düzgün (born 1988), Turkish national goalball player

Male given name 
 Düzgün Yıldırım (born 1963), Dutch politician of Turkish-Kurdish origin

See also 
 Düzgün TV, defunct Turkish-language German television channel targeting Alevis

References

Turkish-language surnames